The FIS Ski Flying World Championships 2020 were the 26th Ski Flying World Championships, held between 10 and 13 December 2020 in Planica, Slovenia.

It was originally scheduled between 19 and 22 March 2020, but on 12 March 2020, it was postponed to the next season due to the COVID-19 pandemic.

Schedule

Test results

Hill test 1
On 8 December 2020, an additional test for lights was scheduled, but was cancelled due to heavy snowfall.

Hill test 2
On 9 December 2020, a second test was held.

Official training results
The training was held on 10 December 2020 at 13:30.

Medal summary

Medals table

Medalists

References

External links
Official website

 
FIS Ski Flying World Championships
2020 in ski jumping
2020 in Slovenian sport
Skiing competitions in Slovenia
International sports competitions hosted by Slovenia
December 2020 sports events in Europe